Pakistanis in Iran consist of expatriates from Pakistan living in Iran, as well as locally born people with ancestral roots in Pakistan. According to the Overseas Pakistanis Foundation, their population is estimated at 11,000 in 2004–2005. While many tend to be students, there are a number of white-collar professionals employed in various jobs.  The majority of the population is centred on Tehran and Mashhad.

A large number of Shia Pakistanis make business travel to Europe via Tehran airport because that is the nearest city served by Lufthansa.

Notable people
 Muhammad Irfan-Maqsood, an entrepreneur active in Iran and well known for his program ScienceTech+ and KarafarinShow. He has been awarded four time top Iranian National Sheikhbahai Entrepreneurship Award from 2013 to 2016. He also has been awarded as the Young Entrepreneur of Iran by Ministry of Sports and Youth Affairs, Iran in 2018.

References

Pakistani diaspora in Iran
Ethnic groups in Iran